Tejgaon may refer to:

Places
 Tejgaon Thana, a thana in Dhaka, Bangladesh
 Tejgaon Airport
 Tejgaon College
 Tejgaon Government Girls' High School
 Tejgaon Government High School
 Tejgaon Mohila College
 Tejgaon Industrial Area Thana, a thana in Dhaka, Bangladesh
 Tejgaon, Raebareli, a village in Uttar Pradesh, India